Arne Orrgård (born 21 September 1943) is a Swedish former sports shooter. He competed in the skeet event at the 1968 Summer Olympics.

References

External links
 

1943 births
Living people
Swedish male sport shooters
Olympic shooters of Sweden
Shooters at the 1968 Summer Olympics
Sportspeople from Dalarna County